Erindale is a suburb of Adelaide in the City of Burnside. It is on the east side of Glynburn Road, where it borders Leabrook.

The suburb came into existence in 1912 by the sub-division of a property formerly belonging to the estate of James Cowan.  Cowan had purchased the property in 1889 from John Stuart Sanders and renamed it Erindale after his place of birth.

See also
List of cities and towns in South Australia

References

Suburbs of Adelaide